P264 may refer to:
 HMS Archer (P264), a ship of the Royal Navy
 HMS Springer (P264), a submarine of the Royal Navy